Vouga was a municipality in Portugal with its seat in Valongo do Vouga that is now in Águeda Municipality.

It was dissolved in 1853 and the parishes integrated into Águeda Municipality, Albergaria-a-Velha Municipality and Sever do Vouga Municipality.

Former municipalities of Portugal